Peck Range is a range of mountains, ridges and hills, 11 nautical miles (20 km) long north–south and 6 nautical miles (11 km) wide, in the west part of Du Toit Mountains, Black Coast, Palmer Land. The feature rises to about 1,700 m and is bounded to the south by a high snowfield, and to the east and west by unnamed north-flowing glaciers that coalesce at the north end of the range, south of Mount Wever. The range was mapped by United States Geological Survey (USGS) from U.S. Navy aerial photographs taken 1966-69 and was visited by a USGS-BAS joint field party, 1986–87. In association with the names of geologists grouped in this area, named by Advisory Committee on Antarctic Names (US-ACAN) in 1988 after Dallas Lynn Peck, geologist, a world authority on igneous rocks, including granites; eleventh director of the U.S. Geological Survey, 1981–93; previously, Chief Geologist of the Geologic Division, USGS. Bedrock in the range is almost entirely made up of a coarse-grained fresh granite batholith.

Mountain ranges of Palmer Land